Plamen Nikolov (Bulgarian: Пламен Николов; born 1977) is a Bulgarian businessman who was the Prime Minister-designate of Bulgaria, following the victory of There Is Such a People in the July 2021 Bulgarian parliamentary election. He has no prior political experience.
On August 6th, There is Such a People announced its intention to form a minority government, with Nikolov as Prime Minister. On August 10th, Nikolov's candidacy was withdrawn after being unable to secure support.

Before politics
Nikolov was born in Gorna Oryahovitsa in Veliko Tarnovo Province in 1977. After studying at University of Klagenfurt in Austria, Nikolov received his Ph.D in Law, Politics, and Economics from the University of Sofia.  He has worked as a business manager for clients such as Amazon and Intersport.

Reference section

External links section
Plamen Nikolov on the There Is Such A People website

1977 births
Prime Ministers of Bulgaria
Bulgarian businesspeople
There Is Such A People politicians
Sofia University alumni
Living people